Vasily Fyodorovich Kolotov (October 6, 1944 – June 5, 2001) was a Russian weightlifter who competed for the Soviet Union.

At the 1970 World Championships in Columbus, Ohio, United States, he won the 90kg class by 47.5kg and set new world records in the clean and jerk and in the total. He was pronounced the man of the weight class for years to come, however his star soon faded as his compatriot David Rigert, who moved up from the 82.5kg class, started to eclipse him by the end of the year.

Despite this, weightlifters have remembered the standards that Kolotov set in the early 1970s.

Weightlifting achievements 
 Senior World Champion (1970);
 Silver Medalist in Senior World Championships (1971 and 1973);
 Silver Medalist in Senior European Championships (1970);
 Senior USSR National Champion (1969-1971);
 Set ten World records during career.

References 

 Profile at Vasily Kolotov (Retrieved on December 2, 2009).

1944 births
2001 deaths
Russian male weightlifters
20th-century Russian people
21st-century Russian people